In Christian theology, historically patripassianism (as it is referred to in the Western church) is a version of Sabellianism in the Eastern church (and a version of modalism, modalistic monarchianism, or modal monarchism). Modalism is the belief that God the Father, Jesus Christ, and the Holy Spirit are three different modes or aspects of one monadic God, as perceived by the believer, rather than three distinct persons within the Godhead – that there are no real or substantial differences between the three, such that the identity of the Spirit or the Son is that of the Father.

Trinitarian perspective
From the standpoint of the doctrine of the Trinity—one divine being existing in three persons—patripassianism is considered heretical by some Christian churches, since "it simply cannot make sense of the New Testament's teaching on the interpersonal relationship of Father, Son, and Spirit." In this, patripassianism asserts that God the Father—rather than God the Son—became incarnate and suffered on the cross for humanity's redemption. This amplifies the personhood of Jesus Christ as the personality of the Father, but is seen by trinitarians as distorting the spiritual transaction of atonement that was taking place at the cross, which the Apostle Paul described: "God [the Father] was reconciling the world to himself in Christ [the Son], not counting people's sins against them. [...] God [the Father] made him who had no sin [Jesus of Nazareth] to be sin for us, so that in him [the Son] we might become the righteousness of God [the Father]."

It is possible, however, to modify patripassianism so as to acknowledge the Divine Being as having feelings toward, and sharing in the experiences of, both Jesus—whom Christians regard as both human and divine—and other human beings. Full-orbed patripassianism denies Trinitarian distinctions, yet it does not contradict Christianity as defined in the Creeds to say that God feels or experiences things, including nonphysical forms of suffering. With regard to the crucifixion of Jesus, they claim it is consistent with Scriptural teaching to say that God the Father suffered—that is, felt emotional and spiritual pain as he watched his Son suffer on the cross, as it is written "The Spirit searches all things, even the deep things of God [...] no one knows the thoughts of God except the Spirit of God [...] What we have received is [...] the Spirit who is from God."

History
Patripassianism is attested as early as the 2nd century; theologians such as Praxeas speak of God as unipersonal. Patripassianism was referred to as a belief ascribed to those following Sabellianism, after a chief proponent, Sabellius, especially by the chief opponent Tertullian, who also opposed Praexas. Sabellius, considered a founder of an early movement, was a priest who was excommunicated from the Church by Pope Callixtus I in 220 and lived in Rome. Sabellius advanced the doctrine of one God sometimes referred to as the "economic Trinity" and he opposed the orthodox doctrine of the "essential Trinity". Praxeas and Noetus were some major followers.

Because the writings of Sabellius were destroyed it is hard to know if he did actually believe in Patripassianism, but one early version of the Apostles' Creed, recorded by Rufinus, explicitly states that the Father is 'impassible.' This reading dates to about 390 AD. This addition was made in response to patripassianism, which Rufinus evidently regarded as a heresy, while Ignatius believes the incarnate one is the impassible, saying "being impassible, He was in a passible body, being immortal, He was in a mortal body".

Cyprian and Tertullian famously accused the Modalistic Monarchians of patripassianism. The Monarchians taught the unity of the Godhead in Christ and that as the Son suffered the Father also experienced the sufferings. They did not teach that the Father died on the cross, though they were sometimes accused of this.

This term has been used by others such as F. L. Cross and E. A. Livingstone to describe other Oneness religions.

See also 
 Nontrinitarianism
 Trinitarianism

References 

Nontrinitarianism
Nature of Jesus Christ